Al-Mughīra ibn ʿAbd Allāh ibn ʿUmar was a preeminent leader of the Quraysh tribe's Banu Makhzum clan in Mecca in the 6th century. His descendants, the Banu al-Mughira, became the principle house of the Makhzum for the remainder of the pre-Islamic period and in the centuries following the advent of Islam in the 620s.

Life and legacy
Al-Mughira was the son of Abd Allah ibn Umar and a great-grandson of the eponymous progenitor of the Banu Makhzum clan of the Quraysh tribe of Mecca. He was likely active as a leader of his clan and tribe in the mid-6th century CE, a period in which Mecca, traditionally a pilgrimage center for the polytheistic Arabs during the pre-Islamic period, was becoming a political center as well. Al-Mughira was a contemporary of Abd al-Muttalib of the Quraysh's Banu Hashim clan and the grandfather of the Islamic prophet Muhammad. Anecdotes recorded by the 8th- and 9th-century historians Mus'ab al-Zubayri and al-Baladhuri mention that al-Mughira provoked a rebellion by the nomadic Banu Fazara tribe as a result of disbarring the Fazara's chieftain from making the pilgrimage to Mecca's religious sanctuary, the Ka'aba.

The Makzhum became the Quraysh's strongest and wealthiest clan during the pre-Islamic period as a result of al-Mughira's leadership. Under him or his sons, Mecca was introduced to trade with foreign markets, particularly with South Arabia and Abyssinia. With the exception of the Ka'aba, the Makhzum controlled Mecca. Al-Mughira's family, known as the Banu al-Mughira, became the preeminent household of the Makzhum and for the remainder of the pre-Islamic period and throughout the post-Islamic period most notable members of the Makhzum were descendants of al-Mughira. The families of al-Mughira's at least nineteen brothers and cousins became cadet branches of the clan. Al-Mughira had thirteen or fourteen sons, including Hisham, al-Walid, Abu Umayya, Abu Rabi'a and Hashim. Seven or eight of al-Mughira's grandsons were slain at the Battle of Badr against Muhammad and his followers in 624. Among his descendants who played a prominent role during the early Muslim conquests were Khalid ibn al-Walid, Ikrima ibn Abi Jahl and al-Harith ibn Hisham.

References

Bibliography

6th-century Arabs
Banu Makhzum